Campo Largo is a municipality in Paraná, Brazil. The inhabitants are known in Brazil as campolarguense. It is also a near suburb of Curitiba.  The town is best known for its large product of porcelain. It is headquarters to companies such as: 'Incepa', 'Porcelana Schmidt', 'Germer', 'Lorenzetti'. 'Ouro Fino' mineral water also comes from this town.

History

The gold rush on Paraná in the middle of 16th century was the main reason to the first settlements which gives origin to the city. Gold extraction was followed by cattle and stop points to explorers on the way to São Paulo.
  
Colonization was made by the original Brazilian population of that time, mainly Portuguese and Africans, in combination with the recent immigration wave of European immigrants, mainly from Poland, Italy and Germany, which were attracted by the Brazilian government incentives and  the temperate climate preferring to immigrate instead of continuing in a Europe devastated by poverty and religious prosecutions.

References

External links

Municipalities in Paraná
Populated places established in 1870
1870 establishments in Brazil